Sibusiso Isaac Papa (6 October 1987 – 2 February 2014) was a South African professional footballer who played for Witbank Spurs in the National First Division, as a midfielder. He died in a car accident on 2 February 2014.

References

1987 births
2014 deaths
South African soccer players
Association football midfielders
Road incident deaths in South Africa
Witbank Spurs F.C. players